Jilya was a Palestinian Arab village in the Ramle Subdistrict of Mandatory Palestine. The Romans referred to it as Jilya by Galla.   It was depopulated during the 1948 Arab–Israeli War by the Givati Brigade of the first stage of Operation Dani on July 9, 1948. It was located 17 km south of Ramla.

History
The PEF's Survey of Western Palestine (SWP) thought that Jilya was the Gallaa of the Onomasticon, mentioned as a town near Accaron.

Ottoman era
Jilya, like all of Palestine was incorporated into the Ottoman Empire in 1517.  In the 1596  tax registers, it was listed as an entirely Muslim village,  located in the nahiya of  Gazza in the liwa of  Gazza, with a population of 17 families; an estimated  population of 94.  The inhabitants paid a fixed tax rate of 33,3% on agricultural products, including wheat, barley, summer crops, vineyards,  goats and beehives, in addition to occasional revenues; a total of 2,200  akçe.
  
In 1882 the  SWP described it as "an ordinary village of adobe and stone."

British Mandate era
In the 1922 census of Palestine, conducted by the British Mandate authorities, Jilia had a population of 269, all  Muslims,  increasing slightly in the 1931 census to  271 Muslims, in 63 houses.

In the 1945 statistics, the population had increased to 330 Muslims,  while the total land area was 10,347  dunams, according to an official land and population survey.  Of this, a total of 7,677 dunums of village land was used for cereals, 40 dunums were irrigated or used for plantations,  while 7  dunams were classified as built-up  areas.

1948, aftermath
Jilya was depopulated on July 9–10, 1948.  On 16 July 1948, during Operation An-Far, Givati HQ informed General Staff\Operations that "our forces have entered the villages of Qazaza, Kheima, Jilya,  Idnibba, Mughallis, expelled the inhabitants, [and] blown up and torched a number of houses. The area is at the moment clear of Arabs."  On the July 19th, refugees near  Jilya were warned by Israeli forces that they would be killed if they tried  to return to their village.

In 1992 it was noted about the village site: "The area is fenced in and inaccessible".

References

Bibliography

External links
Welcome To Jilya
Jilya, Zochrot
Survey of Western Palestine, Map 16:   IAA, Wikimedia commons
Jilya, from the Khalil Sakakini Cultural Center 

Arab villages depopulated during the 1948 Arab–Israeli War
District of Ramla